Muscarella samacensis is a species of orchid plant native to Guatemala.

References 

Pleurothallidinae
Flora of Guatemala